Aravind Malagatti (born 1 May 1956) is a prominent Indian poet and writer in Kannada-language. He is the author of more than forty books which include poetry collections, short fiction collections, a novel, essay-collections, critical works and folklore studies. He is the recipient of the prestigious Ambedkar Fellowship Award from the Government of Karnataka. His Government Brahamana, the first Dalit autobiography in Kannada, has won the Karnataka Sahitya Academy Award. Apart from these, the Honorary Award of Karnataka Sahitya Academy was conferred on him for his total contribution to Kannada literature. He is appointed as Chairman for Kannada Sahitya Academy.

Malagatti is known for being a thoughtful orator. He has founded a number of Dalit organizations and has played an active role in the Dalit movement. He served as professor of Kannada in the Kuvempu Institute of Kannada Studies, Mysore University. He has also served as the Director of the Institute and as the Director of Prasaranga, the publication wing of Mysore University, prior to this. He is also served as the Hon. Director of Jayalakshmi Vilas Palace Museum, Mysore University.

Bibliography

Poetry 
 Mookanige Baayi Bandaaga (When the dumb opens his mouth, 1982)
 Kappu Kavya (Black Poetry, 1985)
 Mooraneya Kannu (The Third Eye, 1996)
 Naada Nianaada(Rhythm Re-Rhythm, 1999)
 Aneel Aradhana (Composite Poetry, 2002)
 Silicon City Mattu Kogile (Silicon City and the Cuckoo, 2003)
 Chandaal Swargaarohanam (The Untouchable Ascends to Heaven, 2003)
 Aravinda Malagattiyavara Ayda Kavithegalu (Selected Poems of Aravind Malagatti, 2004)
 Kavyakumkume(Selected Poems of Aravinda Malagatti, 2009)
 The Dark Cosmos: Selected Poems of Aravinda Malagatti (2009) Translated into English by Dr. C. Naganna aravinda malagatti
 Vishwatomukha (Towards the universe, 2010)
 Huvu Balubhara (Flower is too heavy, 2010)
 Ru Nisheda Chakrakavya (Rupee Banned Circle Poetry, 2016)
Government Brahmana(government Brahman)

Short stories 
 Mugiyada Kategalu (Unending Stories, 2000)

Novel 
 Karya (The Death Ceremony, 1988)

Drama 
 Masthakaabhisheka (The Ablution, 1983)
 Samudradolagana Uppu (The Salt in the Ocean, 1999)

Criticism, literary and social thought 
 Dalitha Yuga Mattu Kannada Sahithya (Dalit Millennium and Kannada Literature, 1999)
 Dalita Prange: Sahithya, Samaaja Mattu Samskuthi (Dalit Consciousness: Literature, society and Culture, 2003)
 Samskuthika Dange (Cultural mutiny, 2004)
 Benki Beldingalu (Fire and Moonlight, 2006)
 Sahitya Saakshi(A Collection of Critical Essays, 2009)
 Selected writing's of Aravind Malagatti(Translated works, Ed. Prof: D.A.Shankar, 2011)

Autobiography 
Government Brahmana (1994) Translated into English, Pub. Oriental Longman

Folklore research and miscellany 
 Anipeeni-Janapada Samshodhane (1983)
 Jaanapada Vyasanga (Study of Folklore, 1985)
 Jaanapada Shobha (Search for Folklore, 1990)
 Thuluvara Aati Kalenja-Janapada Samshodane (1993)
 Janapada Aatagalu (Folk Games, 1993)

Research 
 Bhootaradhane (Ghost Worship, 1991)
 Dalita Sahithya Chalvaliy thatvika Chinthane (Theoretical Study of Dalit Literary Movement, 1991)
 Purana Jaanapada mattu Deshivaada (Myth, Folklore and Nativism, 1998)
 Janapada Aatagalu (Folk Games Ph.D. Thesis-1985)
 Janapada Abhiyana (Folk Journey, 2005)
 Chutuku Chinthana (A Study of Epigrams, 2016 )

Studies and reflections 
 Dalitha Sahithya Praveshike (An Introduction to Dalit Literature, 1996)
 Antharjaathiy Vivaaha yeshtu pragathipara? (How Progressive is Intercaste-Marriage? 1996)
 Poonapyakt Mattu Dalitarettha Sagabeku? (Poona Pact: What Should be the Dalit Approach? 1998)
 Dalitha Sahithya Yana (Journey to Dalit Literature, 2016)

See also
 K. B. Siddaiah
 Siddalingaiah
 C. P. Siddhashrama
 Nanjaiah Honganuru
 C. P. Krishnakumar

Further reading 
 Satyanarayana, K & Tharu, Susie (2011) No Alphabet in Sight: New Dalit Writing from South Asia, Dossier 1: Tamil and Malayalam, New Delhi: Penguin Books.
 Satyanarayana, K & Tharu, Susie (2013) From those Stubs Steel Nibs are Sprouting: New Dalit Writing from South Asia, Dossier 2: Kannada and Telugu, New Delhi: HarperCollins India.

References 

Dalit writers
Kannada-language writers
Living people
1956 births
Recipients of the Rajyotsava Award 2011